The Association of Ambulance Chief Executives is a non-statutory organisation that facilitates the coordination of programmes of work and policies across National Health Service ambulance services trusts in England. It is analogous to the National Police Chiefs' Council for police forces in the United Kingdom.

It advocates closer integration between 999 and 111 services as this allows excess capacity to be utilised to respond to less urgent 999 calls.

In September 2022 the association released figures showing patient handover data. 203,000 patients experienced handover delays exceeding 15 minutes, with 146,000 hours lost to 15 minute+ handover delays, the third highest on record.

Membership
Membership comprises the chief executives of the following ambulance services:

Full members:
 The 10 English ambulance services trusts
Associate members:
 Isle of Wight NHS Trust
 Isle of Man Ambulance Service
 States of Jersey Ambulance Service
 Guernsey Ambulance and Rescue Service
 Gibraltar Health Authority

See also
Emergency medical services in the United Kingdom

References

External links

Medical and health organisations based in England